Ballbreakers is an American pocket billiards game show that began on the Game Show Network on July 18, 2005. The hosts were Sal Masekela, Ewa Mataya Laurance, and Adrianne Curry. GSN cancelled the show in 2006.

Play
The show featured four people who first auditioned for the show in both categories of personality and pool skill. The four contestants then played games of nine ball against one another for bets. At the beginning of the show, each contestant was given $5,000 for use in betting.

First round
During warm-ups, a player was selected for control of the table. He decided whom to play against for the first game. The minimum bet in the first round was $1,000 per game. The first round continued until all players had played at least once, at which point the two players with the least money were pitted against one another in an elimination round.

Side betting
Any player with money was allowed to place a side bet on the current game (even one of the competing players). Anything could be bet on; for example, which contestant would win, whether a particular ball would be made or missed, or whether one player would "run out the table." All side bets were in $500 increments, but the bettor was required to find a taker for a bet to be official.

Elimination round
The two players with the smallest bankrolls at the end of a round were forced to play one game to survive. Whoever had the smaller bankroll was of necessity all-in, and the opponent put in an equal amount. The winner of the game survived to move on to the next round, and collected winnings as usual. If the "all-in" player moved on, that meant leftover money was in contention. The winner of the "Table Control" game collected all of this contended money.

Second round
In round two, minimum bets were $2,000, and the challenged player could not back down. The challenged player could either accept the stakes or raise. Side bets were still bottomed at $500, and the winner of the first game played against the other player in the round. In addition, failing to make a ball on the break gave the opponent ball-in-hand. After two games, the two low scorers played in the Elimination game as in round one.

Final round
In the final round, the two remaining players played for all of the money. In this round, missing any shot gave the opponent ball-in-hand. The first three games were 'all-in' affairs; if the player with more money could win any of them, the show was over and the $20,000 won. If the round went three games with no player having all $20,000, the fourth game was played for all of the cash, regardless of each player's bankroll at that time.

Celebrity shows
For celebrity shows the rules were altered, in round 1, each player automatically risked $1,000 and no higher during games, side bets were limited to $500. In round 2, players risked $2,000 for each game. In the final round consisted of three sudden death games, with the player in 4th facing 3rd, the winner playing the person in 2nd, the winner of that playing against the player in first, the winner received $20,000 for their charity, the others received $10,000 for their charities, all four celebrities also received a Brunswick pool table for themselves.

Two celebrity shows were broadcast.

References

http://www.prnewswire.com/news-releases/ballbreakers-to-premiere-july-18-on-gsn-54533572.html

2000s American game shows
2005 American television series debuts
2006 American television series endings
Game Show Network original programming
Cue sports on television
English-language television shows